The ALCO FA was a family of B-B diesel locomotives designed to haul freight trains. The locomotives were built by a partnership of ALCO and General Electric in Schenectady, New York, between January 1946 and May 1959. Designed by General Electric's Ray Patten (along with their ALCO PA cousins), they were of a cab unit design; both cab-equipped lead (A unit) FA and cabless booster (B unit) FB models were built. A dual passenger-freight version, the FPA/FPB, was also offered. It was equipped with a steam generator for heating passenger cars.

ALCO's designation of F marks these locomotives as being geared primarily for freight use, whereas the P designation of the PA sets indicates that they were geared for higher speeds and passenger use. However, beyond this their design was largely similar - aside from the PA/PB's both being larger A1A-A1A types with an even more striking nose - and many railroads used FA and PA locomotives for both freight and passenger service.

Several examples of FAs and FBs have been preserved. While most are now in the care of railroad museums, a few remain in operational status on such lines as the Cuyahoga Valley Scenic Railroad, Grand Canyon Railway and the Napa Valley Wine Train.

Service history

Three different models were offered. The FA-1/FB-1, which featured a  rating, was built from January 1946 to October 1950, with a  version produced between March and August 1950 (many early models were subsequently upgraded to 1,600 hp). The  FA-2/FB-2 (along with the FPA-2/FPB-2 variants) was built between October 1950 and June 1956. Finally, the  FPA-4/FPB-4, powered by the 251 V-12 engine, was built between October 1958 and May 1959 by ALCO's Canadian subsidiary, Montreal Locomotive Works (MLW).

The FAs, as well as their cousins, the ALCO PAs, were born as a result of ALCO's development of a new diesel engine design, the Model 244.  In early 1944, development started on the new design, and by November 1945, the first engines were beginning to undergo tests.  This unusually short testing sequence was brought about by the decision of ALCO's senior management that the engine and an associated line of road locomotives had to be introduced no later than the end of 1946.

In preparation for this deadline, by January 1946, the first four locomotives with the 244 engines had been built. Two FA-1s and an FB-1 were painted in ALCO Demonstrator colors and were released for road tests for a month and a half on the Delaware and Hudson Railway.

A strike at ALCO delayed production beyond the first four units and the three demonstrator units began working on the Gulf, Mobile, and Ohio Railroad in mid February 1946. The demonstrators were returned to Schenectady when the remainder of the order began delivery in May 1946.

The GM&O order was completed in April 1947 for a total of 80 units. Before the end of this production run, ALCO upgraded the generators and traction motors in the locomotives, with the first of these models entering service in February 1947 for the New York Central.

In 1950, the Montreal Locomotive Works, an affiliate of ALCO, began production of FAs as well. In the fall of 1950, an upgraded model, the FA-2, was launched. This model featured an uprated Model 244 engine, with an output of 1,600 horsepower. Additionally, the carbody was lengthened, making possible the addition of a steam generator in the A unit to allow for use in passenger service.  Models equipped as such were designated the FPA-2/FPB-2.

The first FA-2s were delivered in October 1950 to the Baltimore and Ohio and the Erie.  By this time, however, the cab unit had fallen out of favor due to the greater versatility of road switchers, and US production of the FA line ended in 1956, with Canadian production ending in 1959.

From the 1970s until 1999, the Long Island Rail Road used 20 FA units converted into "power packs". The traction motors were removed, and original prime movers replaced with 600 horsepower (450 kW) engines/generators solely for supplying Head-end power (HEP). The engineer's control stand was left intact, allowing the engines to be used in push-pull service with other locomotives, which usually lacked HEP. By the late 1990s and early 2000s, the railroad began retiring the ALCOs in favor of new bi-level cab cars and locomotives with HEP installed.

Original production

Units produced by ALCO and the Montreal Locomotive Works (1946–1956) 
Almost 800 FA units were built by ALCO and MLW, with just over 15% of them sold to New York Central Railroad, and another 5% each to Union Pacific Railroad, Gulf, Mobile and Ohio Railroad and Missouri Pacific Railroad.  About half as many FB units were produced and sold in similar ratios.

Units produced by ALCO and the Montreal Locomotive Works (1950–1959) 
ALCO and MLW built 152 of the various FP models with the largest quantity, 38% of the total production, sold to Canadian National Railway.

Surviving examples

Some 20 units of various designations exist today in a preserved state. Several excursion railways own operating examples which are in regular service, including MLW units received from Via Rail Canada.
The Grand Canyon Railway owns 3 FPA-4s, and two FB-1s.
The Napa Valley Wine Train owns 4 FPA-4s.  
The Cuyahoga Valley Scenic Railroad in Peninsula, Ohio, owns four FPA-4s, of which three are in operation as of 2008.
The New York and Lake Erie Railroad owns one FPA-2 and one FPA-4. Ex-CN/VIA Rail 6758 was FPA-2 but rebuilt and is now a FPA-2U.

Locomotives not sold to tourist railroads have been sold to museums and other owners.
The Illinois Railway Museum owns former Louisville & Nashville FA-2 #314.
The Western Maryland Railway Historical Society owns former Western Maryland FA-2 #302. 
The Railroad Museum of New England owns former New York, New Haven, & Hartford FA-1 #0401.
A private group in Buffalo, New York owns a former New York Central FA-2, #1102.
Spokane, Portland and Seattle Railway FA-1 #866 is undergoing restoration by a private owner in Portland, Oregon. 
Spokane Portland & Seattle FB-1 868B is owned by a private owner in NJ.
The Canadian Railway Museum in Delson, Quebec owns CN FPA-4 #6765 and CN FA-1 #9400.
The Danbury Railway Museum owns an FPA-4 and FPB-4. They have been restored as Canadian National FPA-4 6786 and FPB-4 #6867. Also at the Danbury Railway Museum is ex-New Haven FA-1 0428.
The Monticello Railway Museum houses privately owned CN 6789, an MLW FPA-4, and CN 6862, an MLW FPB-4. The A-B set was restored into operating condition and CN 6789 is used on museum trains. Both have been repainted into the green/yellow scheme that CN used early on.
Canadian Pacific FA-2 4090 and FB-2 4469 survive as static displays at the Canadian Museum of Rail Travel.
The Anthracite Railroads Historical Society owns former Louisville & Nashville FA-2 #315.
Western Maryland FA-2 #303 is stored in Barton, MD on the Georges Creek Railway. It was recently sold to a railroad shop in Kansas City. 
Canadian National 6854 is owned by a private owner in Bridgeton, NJ.
Canadian National 6783 has recently moved to Tennessee.

ALCO "World Locomotive"
Alco built 23 A1A-A1A trucked FCA-3s for Pakistan Railways in 1951 and 1953. These were the equivalent of an FPA-2 riding on A1A trucks. ALCO's "World Locomotive", the DL500 (introduced in 1953), originated as a newly designed demonstrator based on the FA-2. All DL500s were built with C-C trucks, but B-B or paired A-1-A trucks were offered as an option. The only locale within the Americas where ALCO-built cab units, such as All America Latina Logistica (ALL), still see daily usage in freight duty is Argentina. A total of 369 DL500 locomotives were built by ALCO, AE Goodwin, and MLW between May 1953 and December 1967.

Australia 

Variants of the ALCO "World Locomotive" saw service in Australia, where it was built under license by AE Goodwin. Six single-cab locomotives were delivered to the  broad-gauge South Australian Railways (SAR) in 1955 as the 930 class. In 1957, the SAR received the first of an eventual 31 built to a two-cab  design, the end with the second cab being flat-fronted. A few months later, the first of an up-rated version of the two-cab  design arrived on the standard gauge New South Wales Government Railways as the 44 class, of which 100 were in service by 1968.

Europe, Asia and Latin America 

Similar DL500 locomotives were also used in Greece, Pakistan, Peru, and Spain.

India 

In india the DL500 were introduced as the Indian locomotive class WDM-1 in 1957. They were in service until the early 2000s.

See also 
 List of ALCO diesel locomotives
 List of MLW diesel locomotives

References

Specific

External links

 Alco FA-1/FB-1 Roster
 Alco FA-2/FB-2 Roster
 Alco FCA-3 Roster
 MLW FPA & FPB Roster
 Preserved Alco Cab Units
 New York Central ALCO FA-2 #1102 — documents the restoration efforts of the Western New York Railway Historical Society.
 Project 302 — documents the restoration efforts of the Western Maryland Railway Historical Society regarding Western Maryland Railway No. 302, an ALCO Model FA-2.

B-B locomotives
FA
FA
Schenectady, New York
Diesel-electric locomotives of the United States
Railway locomotives introduced in 1946
Locomotives with cabless variants
Freight locomotives
Standard gauge locomotives of the United States
Diesel-electric locomotives of Brazil
Diesel-electric locomotives of Pakistan
Standard gauge locomotives of Canada
Standard gauge locomotives of Mexico
Standard gauge locomotives of Cuba
Standard gauge locomotives of Pakistan
5 ft 3 in gauge locomotives
Diesel-electric locomotives of Canada
Diesel-electric locomotives of Cuba
Diesel-electric locomotives of Mexico
Streamlined diesel locomotives